Operation Neptune was the code name for the naval phase of the Allied Invasion of Normandy during World War II.

Operation Neptune may also refer to:
Operation Neptune (espionage), a disinformation campaign by communist Czechoslovakia in 1964
Operation Neptune (Afghanistan) (2005)
Operation Neptune (New Zealand), a commemoration of the 75th anniversary of the New Zealand Navy
Operation Neptune (video game), a computer game
Operation Neptune (Germany), an attack in the Kuban in April 1943 by the Germans.

See also
Operation Neptune Spear, the killing of Osama Bin Laden